The 1993 IBF World Championships (World Badminton Championships) were held in Birmingham, England in 1993. Following the results of the men's doubles.

Qualification
 Daniel Gaspar / Zdeněk Musil -  Bernardo Monreal / Enrique Parrales: 15-8, 15-4
 Dayle Blencowe / Geraint Lewis -  Jerzy Dołhan / Grzegorz Olchowik: w.o.
 Peter Kreulitsch /  Mark Peard -  David Cole / Kenneth Vella: 15-6, 15-3
 Michael Adams / Chris Hunt -  Vladislav Druzchenko / Valerij Strelcov: 18-15, 9-15, 15-9 
 Manuel Dubrulle / Etienne Thobois -  Danjuma Fatauchi / Adewole Sanyaolu: w.o.
 Ali Reza Shafiee / Saed Bahador Zakizadeh -  Michał Mirowski / Damian Pławecki: w.o.
 Peter Blackburn / Mark Nichols -  Michael Keck / Uwe Ossenbrink: 15-13, 9-15, 15-3
 Russell Hogg / Kenny Middlemiss -  Leonid Pugach / Sergej Repka: w.o.
 Jiang Xin / Yu Qi -  Leonid Pugach / Sergej Repka: 4-15, 15-7, 15-7
 Jacek Hankiewicz / Dariusz Zięba -  Aleš Babnik / Miha Kosnik: 15-2, 15-4
 Þorsteinn Páll Hængsson /  Nick Hall -  Pullela Gopichand / George Thomas: 10-15, 15-1, 15-6
 Fumihiko Machida / Koji Miya -  Mirza Ali Yar Beg / Mohammed Saqib Majeed: w.o.
 Michael Helber / Markus Keck -  Christophe Jeanjean / Jean-Frederic Massias: 15-5, 15-9
 Chan Siu Kwong / Ng Pak Kum -  Martin Farrugia / Aldo Polidano: 15-2, 15-5
 Boris Kessov /  Quinten van Dalm -  Egidijus Jankauskas / Aivaras Kvedarauskas: 15-6, 15-8
 Árni Þór Hallgrímsson / Broddi Kristjánsson -  Hameed Nasimi / Morteza Validarvi: 15-0, 15-11
 Erik Lia / Trond Waaland -  Yves de Negri / Filip Vigneron: 15-10, 18-15
 David Humble / Anil Kaul -  Satish Narasimhan / Pritesh Shah: 15-4, 15-3

Main stage

Section 1

Section 2

Section 3

Section 4

Final stage

External links
BWF Results

1993 IBF World Championships